William A. Lester, Jr. (born April 24, 1937) is an American chemist who is a professor of the graduate school at the University of California, Berkeley. He was awarded the National Organization for the Professional Advancement of Black Chemists and Chemical Engineers Percy L. Julian Award in 1979 and elected a Fellow of the American Association for the Advancement of Science in 2001.

Early life and education 
Lester was born in the South Side, Chicago, when schools were still segregated. After World War II his family moved and he enrolled at a high school that had previously been only for white people. With the support of a librarian from his high school, Lester secured a scholarship, which allowed him to attend the University of Chicago. He completed his bachelor's degree in chemistry, during which he secured a part-time research position in the Laboratory of Molecular Structure and Spectra. The lab was based in the department of physics, which was directed by future Nobel laureate Robert S. Mulliken. These interactions prompted him to focus on molecular quantum mechanics. He was supported by Henry Taube to pursue a master's degree, which he completed under the supervision of Stuart A. Rice. He moved to the Catholic University of America for doctoral research on the molecular orbital structure of H3. After graduating, Lester joined the National Institute of Standards and Technology (NIST), where he spent three years as a physical chemist.

Research and career 
In 1966, Lester joined the faculty at the University of Wisconsin–Madison, where he joined the Theoretical Chemistry Institute. After working in Wisconsin for two years he attended an American Physical Society meeting in University of California, Berkeley, during which time he visited the IBM Research Lab. They offered him a position, and he joined Joseph Gayles and worked on atom-molecule inelastic scattering.  He moved to the Lawrence Berkeley National Laboratory in 1978, where he was awarded the Percy L. Julian Award. In 1984 he was made Fellow of the American Physical Society, and in 1991 he was elected Fellow of the American Association for the Advancement of Science.

Lester's research made use of computational chemistry to understand the electronic structures of molecules. He primarily uses the Monte Carlo method. His group developed the matrix elements that connected various electronic sets. In 2007, the University of California, Berkeley held a special symposium in honor of Lester's seventieth birthday. In 2019 the Association of Top Professionals recognised his distinguished career with a Lifetime Achievement Award.

Selected publications

Personal life 
Lester played basketball. His sporting efforts are honoured at the University of Chicago, where he is recognised as being the first ever play to score over one thousand points, and the only player in history to average over twenty five points a season. He was awarded the University of Chicago Stagg medal. Lester had two children.

References 

1937 births
Living people
Scientists from Chicago
University of Chicago alumni
Catholic University of America alumni
20th-century American chemists
21st-century American chemists
University of California, Berkeley faculty